General elections were held in Mexico on September 5, 1920. The result was a victory for Álvaro Obregón, who received 95.8% of the vote. Obregón was inaugurated on December 1.

Results

President

References

Presidential elections in Mexico
Mexico
General
October 1920 events
Election and referendum articles with incomplete results